General elections were held in the Cook Islands on 11 April 1972. The result was a victory for the ruling Cook Islands Party (CIP), which won 15 of the 22 seats in the Legislative Assembly. The newly formed Democratic Party won seven seats. CIP leader Albert Henry remained Premier.

Background
The Assembly elected in May 1968 had a three-year term, with the next elections expected in 1971. However, in March 1969 a bill was approved to extend the parliamentary term to four years.

Campaign
Prior to the elections the United Cook Islanders party was disbanded, with its members joining the new Democratic Party founded by Thomas Davis after he returned to the Cook Islands from the United States. All candidates except a single independent (Edwin Gold in Mangaia) were from the CIP or Democratic Party.

Incumbent MPs standing down included Director for Health and Aitutaki MP Joseph Williams and Teau-o-Tonga MP Teaukara.

Results

Elected members

Aftermath
Following the elections, Henry formed a new cabinet, in which he held fifteen portfolios. The other ministers were Inatio Akaruru (Minister of Health), William Estall (Minister of Agriculture, Marketing Board Co-operatives and Shipping), Geoffrey Henry (Minister of Education, Justice, Lands and Survey), Tupua Henry (Minister of Housing, Internal Affairs and Public Works), Tiakana Numanga (Minister of Fisheries and Police) and Apenera Short (Minister of Broadcasting, Electric Power Supply, Government Printer and Newspaper Corporation).

References

Elections in the Cook Islands
General election
Cook Islands
Cook Islands
Election and referendum articles with incomplete results